The Encinal Tower was a skyscraper proposed for construction in Downtown Oakland, California. The mixed-use tower was planned to rise  and contain 56 floors for office and residential use. The project design consisted of a glass and X-bracing-covered cylindrical building with one side that resembles a roll of fabric unraveling. If built, the skyscraper would have been the tallest building in Oakland and third-tallest in the Bay Area after 555 California Street and the Transamerica Pyramid, both located in San Francisco. The project had undergone several design and name changes since it was first proposed in 2006. The proposal was withdrawn in 2010, and in 2012 the property sold to a developer who plans a much smaller tower.

Description
The project was located in Downtown Oakland a few blocks away from Lake Merritt and right next to the 19th Street BART station. The site is bounded by Broadway, Franklin, 19th, and 20th streets. Several lowrise buildings and a parking lot currently inhabit the proposed building site. The developers of the project were Chengben (Peter) Wang, and Encinal; the architect is Skidmore, Owings & Merrill.

The proposed building had the shape of an oval cylinder with one side that curves outward and downward. The top 22 floors of the skyscraper would have housed 220 residential units or ten units per floor. There would have been a large,  lobby housing artwork at the base of the building. The building's floorplates will average  in size. Wang intended to make this building a landmark for the city of Oakland.

At  in height, the proposed skyscraper would have far surpassed the -tall Ordway Building as the tallest building in Oakland and tallest in the Bay Area outside San Francisco. The building would have come in as the third-tallest in the Bay Area overall, after the -tall 555 California Street and the -tall Transamerica Pyramid.

History
The developers, Wang and Encinal, first proposed this project as 1930 Broadway sometime in 2006 as the new headquarters of University of California system. He came up with three different designs for the all-office building, ranging from 44 floors -  to 63 floors - . However, the proposal changed into a mixed-use building after the University of California dropped out on the project. The original project schedule called for a construction groundbreaking in 2007 and completion of the skyscraper in 2009.

The roof (level 60) was at en elevation of  relative to the street. The revision also had two basement levels that connected the building to the 19th Street BART station. Once again, the developer submitted other designs for the project, including a 44- to 45-story office / residential building and one that had offices, residential units, and a hotel.

However, sometime in 2007 or 2008, Wang withdrew the proposal as he wasn't pleased with the various designs of the building. Encinal later came back and submitted another proposal in July 2008. The name of the project also changed; it was referred to as Encinal Tower instead of its address 1938 Broadway. Wang put the property on the market in 2012, asking $5.95 million, and sold to Seth Hamilian, who is planning a building of no more than 28 stories.

Notes
A.  This assumes that no taller projects in San Francisco are completed before the Encinal Tower. Such examples include the  181 Fremont Street, and the  Transbay Terminal & Tower.

See also
Emerald Views - a residential skyscraper proposed for the west edge of Lake Merritt in the Lakeside Apartments District
List of tallest buildings in Oakland

References

External links
Thread on Skyscraperpage

Proposed skyscrapers in the United States
Skyscrapers in California